Top Chef: Charleston is the fourteenth season of the American reality television series Top Chef. The season was announced by Bravo on October 13, 2016, which premiered on December 1, 2016, and concluded on March 2, 2017. Filming initially took place in Charleston, South Carolina, beginning in May 2016, while the season's final episodes were filmed in areas across Mexico, including Guadalajara and the Yucatán Peninsula. Top Chef: Charleston featured eight new contestants competing against eight returning contestants from previous seasons. MasterChef and Top Chef Masters alumnus Graham Elliot debuted as a recurring judge, alongside returning judges Padma Lakshmi, Tom Colicchio, and Gail Simmons. In the season finale, Top Chef: Seattle runner-up Brooke Williamson was declared the winner over Top Chef: New Orleans finalist Shirley Chung. Top Chef: Seattle finalist Sheldon Simeon was voted Fan Favorite, his second Fan Favorite win.

Contestants
Top Chef: Charleston featured a cast of 16 chefs, consisting of half rookies and half veterans.

New contestants

Jim Smith returned for Top Chef: Kentucky, competing in the Last Chance Kitchen. Jamie Lynch returned for Top Chef: All-Stars L.A.

Returning contestants

Contestant progress

: The chef(s) did not receive immunity for winning the Quickfire Challenge.
: Gerald lost the Sudden Death Quickfire Challenge and was eliminated.
: Jim lost the Sudden Death Quickfire Challenge and was eliminated.
: Feeling that his dish contributed the most to his team's loss, Jamie voluntarily forfeited his immunity, resulting in his elimination.
: Casey lost the Sudden Death Quickfire Challenge and was eliminated.
: Brooke won Last Chance Kitchen and returned to the competition.
 (WINNER) The chef won the season and was crowned "Top Chef".
 (RUNNER-UP) The chef was the runner-up for the season.
 (WIN) The chef won the Elimination Challenge.
 (HIGH) The chef was selected as one of the top entries in the Elimination Challenge but did not win.
 (IN) The chef was not selected as one of the top or bottom entries in the Elimination Challenge and was safe.
 (LOW) The chef was selected as one of the bottom entries in the Elimination Challenge but was not eliminated.
 (OUT) The chef lost the Elimination Challenge.

Episodes

Last Chance Kitchen

References
Notes

Footnotes

External links
 Official website

Top Chef
2016 American television seasons
2017 American television seasons
Television shows set in Charleston, South Carolina
Television shows filmed in South Carolina
Television shows filmed in Mexico